Nora Edith Koppel (born May 19, 1972 in San Miguel de Tucumán, Tucumán) is an Argentine Olympic weightlifter. She has represented her country at the 2000, 2004 and 2008 Olympics. She is Jewish.

She has had a varied athletic career, beginning when she started gymnastics at the age of 15.  Koppel competed on the Argentine National Gymnastics Team. In her twenties, she became a weightlifter.

In her three Olympic appearance, she earned her highest total in 2004, when she successfully completed a 220-lb snatch and 302.5-lb clean and jerk in the 165-lb category. Before competing in the 2004 Games in Athens, she held the Pan-American record with a 572-lb total.

References

External links
sports-reference

1972 births
Living people
Argentine Jews
Argentine female weightlifters
Jewish Argentine sportspeople
Jewish weightlifters
Olympic weightlifters of Argentina
Sportspeople from San Miguel de Tucumán
Weightlifters at the 2000 Summer Olympics
Weightlifters at the 2004 Summer Olympics
Weightlifters at the 2008 Summer Olympics
Pan American Games silver medalists for Argentina
Weightlifters at the 2003 Pan American Games
Pan American Games medalists in weightlifting
20th-century Argentine women
21st-century Argentine women